Bobby Frank Rule (June 29, 1944 – September 5, 2019) was an American professional basketball player. He played at center in the National Basketball Association (NBA) for the Seattle SuperSonics, Philadelphia 76ers, Cleveland Cavaliers, and the Milwaukee Bucks.

Early years
Rule played high school basketball at Riverside Polytechnic High School.

Early in his college career, Rule played under the legendary Jerry Tarkanian, then head coach at Riverside Community College.  It was under Tarkanian that Rule honed his defensive and footwork skills.  In 1964, Rule was named the Most Valuable Player of the California Junior College State Championships after leading the Riverside City College Tigers to a 35-0 record and the school's first state championship team. Looking back years later, in retirement, Tarkanian commented that Rule "might be the best player I ever coached" and that Rule was "the most dominant player in the history of California junior college basketball."

Rule then transferred to and starred at Colorado State for two seasons.  In 1966, Rule and Colorado State made the NCAA tournament but lost to a Houston team that featured future Hall of Famer Elvin Hayes.

Rule played in the Amateur Athletic Association for the Denver Capitol Federal during the 1966-67 season and was named an All-American.

NBA
A second round pick in the 1967 NBA draft, Rule quickly became one of the stars of Seattle's expansion franchise.  Named to the 1967–68 NBA All-Rookie Team, Rule's 18.1 points per game average stood as the SuperSonics rookie record for forty seasons, until broken by Kevin Durant in 2008.  His rebounding average of 9.5 is the second best ever by a SuperSonics rookie, behind only Pete Cross's 12.0 in the 1970–71 season.  Also during his rookie season, Rule scored 47 points in a game against the Los Angeles Lakers — still a SuperSonics rookie record.

Rule's game grew stronger during the next two seasons.  In the 1968–69 season, he averaged 24.0 points per game and 11.5 rebounds per game.  In the 1969–70 season, he averaged 24.6 points per game and 10.3 rebounds per game, scored 40 or more points on five separate occasions (including a then-SuperSonics record of 49 points in a game against the Philadelphia 76ers), and played in the 1970 NBA All-Star Game.

In the 1970–71 season, Rule began the season averaging 32.7 points per game and 13.7 rebounds per game over the first three games.  In the fourth game, after scoring 21 points and pulling down five rebounds in the first half, Rule had a season-ending torn achilles tendon, ending his season at 29.8 points per game and 11.5 rebounds per game Rule never regained his All-Star form and saw limited playing time thereafter.  By 1974 his career was over.

Later years
Rule was inducted into the Riverside City College Athletics Hall of Fame in 2011.

Rule died on September 5, 2019 in Riverside, California.

NBA career statistics

Regular season

References

External links

Seattle SuperSonics History

1944 births
2019 deaths
Amateur Athletic Union men's basketball players
American men's basketball players
Basketball players from Riverside, California
Centers (basketball)
Cleveland Cavaliers players
Colorado State Rams men's basketball players
Milwaukee Bucks players
National Basketball Association All-Stars
Philadelphia 76ers players
Riverside City Tigers men's basketball players
Seattle SuperSonics draft picks
Seattle SuperSonics players